Middle Brother, also known as Île du Milieu, is an 8-hectare coral island on the Great Chagos Bank atoll of the Chagos Archipelago in the British Indian Ocean Territory.  It is one of the three islands in the Three Brothers group on the western side of the atoll, and forms part of the Chagos Archipelago strict nature reserve.  It has been identified as an Important Bird Area by BirdLife International for its significance as a breeding site for seabirds, notably sooty terns, of which 12,500 pair were recorded in a 2004 survey.

References

Important Bird Areas of the British Indian Ocean Territory
Seabird colonies
Chagos Archipelago
Nature reserves